Calvin Hunt  (born 1956, Kwakiutl) is a Canadian First Nations artist from Fort Rupert, British Columbia. The Kwakiutl are part of the larger nation Kwakwaka'wakw.

He is a descendant of the renowned Tlingit ethnologist George Hunt.  He was apprenticed as a teenager to his second cousin Tony Hunt, an artist and carver.

He is a woodcarver and owns his own gallery. He was made a member of the Royal Canadian Academy of Arts.

Notes

Sources
 Hunt, Ross (2007) "The Hunt Family's Trip to West Germany to Attend the Bundesgarten Show."  Anthropology News, vol. 48, no. 2, pp. 20–21.
 Macnair, Peter L., Alan L. Hoover, and Kevin Neary (1984) The Legacy: Tradition and Innovation in Northwest Coast Indian Art.  Vancouver, B.C.: Douglas & McIntyre.

1956 births
Living people
20th-century First Nations sculptors
Canadian male sculptors
20th-century Canadian male artists
21st-century First Nations people
21st-century Canadian sculptors
21st-century Canadian male artists
Kwakwa̱ka̱ʼwakw woodcarvers
Members of the Royal Canadian Academy of Arts